Huezo is a surname. Notable people with the surname include:

Kevin Huezo (born 1991), American soccer player
Norberto Huezo (born 1956), Salvadoran footballer
Tatiana Huezo (born 1972), Salvadoran film director
, (born 1965) Salvadoran writer and poet